Kurt Anders Valdemar Lundquist (27 November 1925 – 12 July 2011) was a Swedish sprinter who won a bronze medal in the 4×400 m relay at the 1948 Olympics. Earlier in 1947, he won his only national title, in the 200 m.

Competition record

References

1925 births
2011 deaths
Swedish male sprinters
Olympic bronze medalists for Sweden
Olympic athletes of Sweden
Athletes (track and field) at the 1948 Summer Olympics
People from Sala Municipality
Medalists at the 1948 Summer Olympics
Olympic bronze medalists in athletics (track and field)
Sportspeople from Västmanland County
20th-century Swedish people